In fluid dynamics, the Lamb–Oseen vortex models a line vortex that decays due to viscosity. This vortex is named after Horace Lamb and  Carl Wilhelm Oseen.

Mathematical description
Oseen looked for a solution for the Navier–Stokes equations in cylindrical coordinates  with velocity components  of the form

where  is the circulation of the vortex core. Navier-Stokes equations lead to

where  is the kinematic viscosity of the fluid. At , we have a potential vortex with concentrated vorticity at the  axis; and this vorticity diffuses away as time  passes.

The only non-zero vorticity component is in the  direction, given by

The pressure field simply ensures the vortex rotates in the circumferential direction, providing the centripetal force

where ρ is the constant density

Generalized Oseen vortex
The generalized Oseen vortex may obtained by looking for solutions of the form

that leads to the equation

Self-similar solution exists for the coordinate , provided , where  is a constant, in which case . The solution for  may be written according to Rott (1958) as

where  is an arbitrary constant. For , the classical Lamb–Oseen vortex is recovered. The case  corresponds to the axisymmetric stagnation point flow, where  is a constant. For arbitrary , the solution becomes  , where  is an arbitrary constant. As , Burgers vortex is recovered.

See also 
 The Rankine vortex and Kaufmann (Scully) vortex are common simplified approximations for a viscous vortex.

References

Vortices
Equations of fluid dynamics